The Chief of Defence is the chief of defence and commander of the Finnish Defence Forces, under the authority of the President of Finland.

The Chief of Defence commands the Finnish Army, the Finnish Air Force, the Finnish Navy and is assisted by the Defence Command. He is the highest-ranking officer of the forces (Admiral or General) and his deputy is the Chief of Staff of the Defence Command.

The current Chief of Defence is General Timo Kivinen.

Role and functions
In contrast to many other Western countries, the Finnish Defence Forces have an actual military commander with direct authority over all forces, and the Chief of Staff is a separate position. The Chief of Defence is responsible for all operative aspects of the Defence Forces, while the Ministry of Defence, headed by the civilian minister, plans the long-term economical aspects. In administrative matters, the Chief of Defence has the authority to form or disband any unit below brigade level and to make any necessary reorganization to the command structure of the Defence Forces, unless such changes have wide impacts on the Finnish society, on the finances of the state or on the personnel of the Defence Forces. In command matters, the Chief of Defence has the authority to make any command decision that is not reserved to the President of Finland. In matters reserved to the Minister of Defence or to the President of Finland, the Chief of Defence prepares the decision and introduces his proposal to the Minister or to the President.

The immediate subordinates of the Chief of Defence are 
Chief-of-staff of the Defence Command
Commander of the Finnish Army
Commander of the Finnish Navy
Commander of the Finnish Air Force
Rector of the National Defence University

The Chief of Defence is appointed by the President on the nomination of the Finnish Council of State and may be asked to retire whenever a reason occurs. However, since 1972, all Chiefs of Defence have retired only after fulfilling the statutory retirement age of 63.

List of Finnish Chiefs of Defence

Notes

References

Military of Finland
Finland